The 2016–17 United Counties League season (known as the 2016–17 ChromaSport & Trophies United Counties League for sponsorship reasons) was the 110th in the history of the United Counties League, a football competition in England.

Premier Division

The Premier Division featured 20 clubs which competed in the division last season, along with two new clubs, promoted from Division One:
Peterborough Sports
Northampton ON Chenecks

League table

Promotion criteria	
To be promoted at the end of the season a team must:	
 Have applied to be considered for promotion by 30 November 2016	
 Pass a ground grading examination by 31 March 2017	
 Finish the season in a position higher than that of any other team also achieving criteria 1 and 2	
 Finish the season in one of the top three positions

The following three teams have achieved criterion one:
 Eynesbury Rovers
 Newport Pagnell Town
 Peterborough Sports

Division One

Division One featured 17 clubs which competed in the division last season, along with three new clubs:
Daventry Town, voluntarily demoted from the Northern Premier League 
Melton Mowbray, promoted from the Leicestershire Senior League and changed name to Melton Town
Whittlesey Athletic, promoted from the Peterborough and District League

League table

References

External links
United Counties League FA Full Time

9
United Counties League seasons